Meho Puzić (24 July 1937 – 25 June 2007) was a Bosnian sevdalinka-folk singer and songwriter.

Early life
Meho Puzić was born on 24 July 1937 in the town of Odžak, into a Bosniak family. He had two brothers named Adem and Bahrija. The latter was also a professional singer. Meho and Bahrija recorded two songs together, "Pjevaj brate" (Sing, Brother) and "Ko čaršijom konja jaše" (Who is Riding a Horse Down the Bazaar), and released them on an extended play titled Meho i Bahrija Puzić in 1974.

Career
He worked as a bricklayer before becoming a professional singer and releasing his first single in 1966. In 1969, Toma Zdravković wrote a song entitled Majko, majko (Mother, Mother) for him. Puzić sang the song in a duet with his wife Hanka.

Death
Meho Puzić died, holding his wife Hanka's hand, on 25 June 2007, a month shy of his 70th birthday. He died a little over two months before his colleague and friend Safet Isović's death on 2 September 2007.

Puzić was buried the day after his death in his hometown of Odžak. His funeral was attended by Hanka Paldum, Beba Selimović, Azemina Grbić, Emina Zečaj, Elvira Rahić, Jasmin Muharemović, Husein Kurtagić (1938–2008) and Omer Pobrić (1945–2010), among others.

Discography

References

1937 births
2007 deaths
People from Odžak
Bosniaks of Bosnia and Herzegovina
Bosnia and Herzegovina Muslims
Sevdalinka
20th-century Bosnia and Herzegovina male singers
Yugoslav male singers